The 2008–09 Duke Blue Devils men's basketball team represented Duke University in the 2008–09 NCAA Division I men's basketball season. The team's head coach was Mike Krzyzewski, who served for his 29th year. The team played its home games in Cameron Indoor Stadium in Durham, North Carolina. The Blue Devils captured the ACC Championship by defeating Florida State in the championship game in Atlanta.

Pre-season
The 2007–08 Duke Blue Devils finished the season 28–6 (13–3), placed second in the ACC regular season standings, and lost in the second round of the NCAA tournament. Earlier in the season, the squad reached as high as #2 in the Coaches' Poll with only one loss. Some late season losses caused them to finish the regular season ranked #9 in the country and #2 in the Atlantic Coast Conference. Duke then lost in the semifinals in the ACC tournament to the Clemson Tigers. Duke was given a #2 seed in the NCAA tournament.  After narrowly defeating #15 Belmont, Duke lost 73–67 to the #7 West Virginia Mountaineers.

Recruiting

On September 26, 2007, forward Olek Czyz committed to Duke University. Czyz is a 6–7 Poland native who has spent the last three years in Reno, Nevada. Both Scout and Rivals.com listed him as the 27th best power forward in the nation. However, Scout.com had him 80th overall, while Rivals.com had him back at 102nd. As a junior at Reno High School, Czyz averaged 18.7 points and 8.3 rebounds per game, leading Reno to a 24–6 record. In his sophomore year, Olek had a ten-point and six rebound average, while leading his team to a state championship. Other schools to make offers to Czyz were Arizona State, Colorado State, Florida, Kentucky, Louisville, Nevada, Pepperdine, and Washington State.

On the first day of November, the Blue Devils received a commitment from Elliot Williams. The 6–4 shooting guard from Memphis, Tennessee was listed as the number 3 shooting guard in the country by Rivals.com, while Scout.com had him as the number 4 shooting guard and the number 14 overall prospect in the country. Williams spent high school at St. George’s where he averaged 25 points, seven rebounds, and six assists per game. In his junior year, Elliot averaged 22 points and six rebounds per contest, while leading his team to a state championship. Williams turned down offers from Clemson, Memphis, Tennessee, Vanderbilt, and Virginia.

Power forward Miles Plumlee, a 6–10 native of Warsaw, Indiana, who attended high school in Arden, North Carolina, committed to the Blue Devils on May 1, 2008. Miles, who is the older brother of 2009 commitment Mason Plumlee, had signed a letter of intent to Stanford University, but after head coach Trent Johnson took the coaching job at Louisiana State, Plumlee requested and was granted a release.  Plumlee is rated as the 17th best power forward of the 2008 recruiting class by Scouts.com, while Rivals has him ranked 29th at forward and 101st overall.

Offseason changes
The only senior Duke lost from their 2007–08 squad was DeMarcus Nelson who graduated. Nelson was projected to go somewhere in the late second round in the 2008 NBA draft, but instead went undrafted. On September 9, 2008, Nelson was signed by the Golden State Warriors.

Joe Alleva, the Duke Athletics Director, interviewed for the athletics director job at Louisiana State on April 1, and was offered for the position on April 3. After 10 years as Duke's athletics director, Alleva took the job and is scheduled to start on July 1. At Duke a twelve-person committee, assembled by Duke President, Richard H. Brodhead, searched for a new athletics director. Joe Alleva said in an interview that he would do anything to help in the search. On May 30, Brodhead announced that the Duke had hired former Notre Dame athletics director Kevin White. Coach Mike Krzyzewski said the White "is one of the most respected people in intercollegiate athletics" and brings " wealth of experience and is someone who people admire".

Duke forward Taylor King decided to transfer to Villanova University in April 2008. As a freshman at Duke, King played in all 34 games, averaging 5.9 points and 2.0 rebounds per game. He had 43 three-pointers that season, putting him eighth all-time against Duke freshmen. When announcing his transfer, King told reporters "Nothing against Duke, but it's time for a change. I needed to explore other places. Villanova is a true family atmosphere where everyone's got each other's back." Per NCAA regulations, King will have to sit out a season.

On April 26, associate head coach Johnny Dawkins announced that he would be leaving the Blue Devils, to take over the head coaching spot at Stanford. Dawkins was a member of the 1986 Duke team that lost in the finals to Louisville. After nine seasons in the NBA, Dawkins was hired as an assistant coach during the 1998–99 season. Two years later he was promoted to associate head coach, a job he's held for nine years.

It was announced on May 5, that Nate James would replace Johnny Dawkins as an assistant coach. James was a captain on the 2000-01 Duke Blue Devils men's basketball team that won a national championship. After turning pro, James played in the Philippines, France, Hungary, Japan and the Netherlands. In 2004, James participated in the training camp of the Philadelphia 76ers, but did not make it onto the team. During the winter of 2007–2008, he was hired to oversee operations at the Duke's new practice facility.

Roster

Rankings

Schedule

|-
!colspan=12 style=| Exhibition

|-
!colspan=12 style=|Regular Season

|-
!colspan=12 style=|ACC Tournament

|-
!colspan=12 style=|NCAA tournament

See also
 2008–09 Duke Blue Devils women's basketball team

References

Duke
Duke
Duke Blue Devils men's basketball seasons
Duke
Duke